Yukari Nonoshita (jp:野々下 由香里, Nonoshita Yukari) is a japanese soprano. She studied at the Tokyo National University of Fine Arts and Music.

On the opera stage, she first appeared in Rennes as Cherubino in Mozart's Le Nozze di Figaro, then in parts such as Rosina in Rossini's Il Barbiere di Siviglia and Siébel in Gounod's Faust at Rennes and Angers. She then returned to Japan, where she has focused on French, Spanish, and Japanese songs of all periods. She took part in Historically informed performances, such as Maasaki Suzuki's project to record all cantatas by Bach, and the Baroque Opera Project of Ryo Terakado. A reviewer of volume 26 of Suzuki's project, which includes Schmücke dich, o liebe Seele, BWV 180, praised her for "her clear upper range and refinement of detail in remarkably well-focused singing".

References

External links 
 Yukari Nonoshita credits AllMusic

Japanese sopranos
21st-century Japanese women opera singers
Year of birth missing (living people)
Living people